The Eipenke is a left tributary of the River Söse near Osterode in the Harz Mountains in the German state of Lower Saxony.

Course 
The Eipenke rises south of the Söse Reservoir and flows below the hill known as the Sösenkopf (423 m) in a western direction. It discharges into the Söse in the Osterode district of Scheerenberg.

See also 
List of rivers of Lower Saxony

References 

Rivers of Lower Saxony
Rivers of the Harz
Göttingen (district)
Rivers of Germany